Resch's is a brand of beer produced by Carlton and United Breweries, available in New South Wales, Australia. It was also the name of the Sydney brewing company who produced the beer brand and were based in Redfern until taken over by Tooth and Co. in 1929.

History

Resch's Limited was a Sydney-based brewery founded by Edmund Resch. The company collapsed in 1929, at which time it was taken over by Tooth and Co. The name lived on in the brands of beer that continued to be produced. Waverley Brewery closed in 1983, and was redeveloped into the Moore Park Gardens Apartment Development by Dealruby in the 1990s. By the 2000s Resch's DB (Double Bitter) and DA (Dinner Ale) had been phased out of production.

Current status
Carlton and United Breweries currently produces Resch's Draught for the New South Wales hotel market.  It is also available in a small number of venues in South East Queensland.  Resch's Pilsener is available in 750ml bottles (known as "longnecks") and 375ml cans throughout the New South Wales and available nationally via online retailers.

Resch's Real Bitter was discontinued in mid-2018 joining other retired varieties including Dinner Ale (DA), Smooth Black Ale, Extra Stout, Premium Lager, Premier Lager, Sydney Bitter and Double Bitter (DB).  Dinner Ale made a limited return in 2022, also in 375mL cans like the Pilsener, and is available only through the Coles Liquor outlets Liquorland and 1st Choice Liquor Market.

In January 2012, Carlton and United Breweries released a limited edition of Resch's Draught in 24 can cartons, using the old green and white labelling as well as the "Resch's Lion" adorning the top of each can.

Reschs Appreciation Society 
On 27 February 2009, the Resch's Appreciation Society was formed.  This has grown steadily in membership over 10 years and contained approximately 9,000 members as of November 2020.  The group regularly meets to socialise and raise money for men's health through the Movember Foundation.

Revival 
Despite a lack of advertising or investment from its current owner, Resch's has been growing in popularity in recent years.  On the 16 September 2019, Resch's was voted Australia's favourite beer in a news.com.au poll. While speculation has continued regarding the main reason for this, the loyalty of Resch's drinkers in the face of the brand's uncool image as 'old man's beer' is remarkable, having retained a core of consumers despite the explosion in marketing of craft beers.

See also

Australian pub
Beer in Australia
List of breweries in Australia

References

External links
 Edmund Resch's biography at Australian Dictionary of Biography
Resch's Appreciation Society Home Page

Australian beer brands
1879 establishments in Australia
Food and drink companies established in 1879
Culture of New South Wales